Four Emperors may refer to:

 The Roman Emperors Galba, Otho, Vitellius, and Vespasian, who successively came to power in AD 68 and 69, the Year of the Four Emperors
 The Yonkou (literally Four Emperors), four pirates in the anime/manga series One Piece
 The Shiseiten, from the manga Samurai Deeper Kyo